GAZ Group is a Russian automotive conglomerate headquartered in Nizhny Novgorod. It comprises 18 manufacturing facilities in eight regions of Russia, as well as sales and service organizations.

GAZ Group is the leading manufacturer of commercial vehicles in Russia. GAZ Group produces light commercial and medium-duty vehicles (GAZ), buses PAZ, KAvZ, LiAZ, cars, powertrain (YaMZ and UMZ) and automotive components. The market shares of the company: about 50% in the light commercial vehicles segment, 58% in the segment of medium-duty trucks, 42% in the all-wheel drive heavy-duty trucks segment and about 65% in the bus segment.

The main entity "GAZ Group" - OJSC "GAZ", refers to the Office "Management Company" GAZ Group. The "GAZ Group" is a holding company, consolidated around OAO GAZ, bringing together a number of industrial machinery sector, which are mainly subsidiaries of OJSC GAZ. Management Company GAZ Group was created on September 28, 2006 and is 100% owned by OJSC "GAZ".

History

GAZ Group was founded in 2005 as a result of the restructuring of the production assets of Ruspromavto, which existed from 2001.

In August 2006, Gaz Group's military technology enterprises JSC Arzamas Machine-Building Plant, in Viksa, and JSC Barnaultransmash became the independent Military Industrial Company to ensure the separation of automotive business of Russian Machines into public (GAZ Group) and non-public (Military-Industrial Company) assets.

In the summer of 2006 "GAZ Group"  acquired UK based manufacturer of light trucks LDV Holdings (Birmingham) for $40,670,000. In the spring of 2009 in connection with the marketing of the crisis caused by, including the global economic crisis, LDV Holdings came under bankruptcy and in early May 2009, GAZ Group agreed to sell the company Malaysian carmaker Weststar.

In 2008, "GAZ Group" has agreed to buy 50% of Italian VM Motori and localization of its engines. Closing of the transaction was to take place after the approval of the antitrust authorities. GAZ Group has also entered into an agreement with General Motors who  controlled 50% of VM Motori on the basis of co-ownership of the Italian company. In mid-2009, the deal was canceled in the aftermath of the economic crisis.

Owners and management
The joint stock company is managed by the Board of Directors whose Chairman, Mr. Wolf, is the sole executive body is the Management Company GAZ Group.

Shareholders of OJSC "GAZ" are:
 JSC Russian Machines - 61.05% of the ordinary shares;
 Minority shareholders - 38.79%;
 Government - 0.16%

The company's capitalization at the end of the I quarter of 2008 was $3.3 billion.

Composition

Divisions
GAZ Group is divided into five divisions (activities), the structure of each of which are production plants and sales organizations.
 GAZ Group Auto Components
 Dies And Molds Plant
 Kanashsky Auto-Aggregate Plant, bus chassis producers.
 GAZ Group Commercial Vehicles
 Gorky Automobile Plant (GAZ) - the main company of the Group, accounting for more than half of the turnover of the entire GAZ Group. Production in 2015: 68,857 vehicles.
 Saransk Dump Truck Plant
 Ulyanovsk Motor Plant
 Nizhny Novgorod Motors
 GAZ Group Powertrain Division
 Yaroslavl Motor Plant
 Yaroslavl Fuel Equipment Plant
 Yaroslavl Diesel Equipment Plant
 GAZ Group Bus Division
 Pavlovo Bus Factory - production in 2015: 5,872 vehicles.
 KAvZ - production in 2015: 318 vehicles.
 Likinsky Bus Plant - production in 2015: 890 vehicles.
 Golitsyn Bus Plant

Companies

 Abakanvagonmash
 Berezka
 Bosal-GAZ
 CHZ-Turbo-Gaz
 Fuel Supply Systems
 Maxus Rus
 Pit-Arsenal
 Production Association Khtz Belgorod
 Remstroy
 Terex Rus
 Tver Excavator
 United Engineering Center, headquartered in Nizhny Novgorod, consisting of 16 units of engineering plants on 18 July 2007 with the goal of working together to update the lineup Gaz Group plants.
 Zavolzhsky Plant Of Caterpillar Tractors

See also

 Russian Machines
 Automotive industry
 Automotive industry in Russia
 Automobile model numbering system in the Soviet Union and Russia

References

External links
 International product website GAZ
 Corporate website GAZ Group

 
Motor vehicle engine manufacturers
Companies listed on the Moscow Exchange
Engine manufacturers of Russia